Victoria Montero (born Victoria Eugenia Montero Enríquez; 25 August 1991) is a Mexican athlete who competes in badminton. In 2010, she participated at the 2010 Central American and Caribbean Games where she won the gold medal in the singles, doubles and team competitions as well as the bronze medal at the mixed competition. In 2011, she participated at the Pan American Games where she won the bronze medal at the singles competition. In 2012, she secured her qualification to represent Mexico at the London Olympics to participate in the singles event via the world ranking. Montero did not advance to the knock-out stage after losing two matches against Tai Tzu-ying of Chinese Taipei, and Anu Nieminen of Finland in the group K stage.

Achievements

Pan American Games 
Women's singles

Central American and Caribbean Games 
Women's singles

Women's doubles

Mixed doubles

Pan Am Junior Championships 
Girls' singles

BWF International Challenge/Series
Women's singles

Women's doubles

Mixed doubles

 BWF International Challenge tournament
 BWF International Series tournament
 BWF Future Series tournament

References

External links
 
 

Mexican female badminton players
1991 births
Living people
Badminton players at the 2012 Summer Olympics
Olympic badminton players of Mexico
Badminton players at the 2011 Pan American Games
Pan American Games bronze medalists for Mexico
Pan American Games medalists in badminton
Competitors at the 2006 Central American and Caribbean Games
Competitors at the 2010 Central American and Caribbean Games
Central American and Caribbean Games gold medalists for Mexico
Central American and Caribbean Games bronze medalists for Mexico
Central American and Caribbean Games medalists in badminton
Medalists at the 2011 Pan American Games
21st-century Mexican women